Rhydding is a rural locality in the Central Highlands Region, Queensland, Australia. In the  Rhydding had a population of 63 people.

Geography 
The Dawson Highway forms most of the northern boundary of Rydding. The Fitzroy Developmental Road enters the locality from the south and has its junction with the Dawson Highway within the locality. A number of creeks flow from south to north through Rhydding; these are ultimately tributaries of the Dawson River, which in turn is a tributary of the Fitzroy River, which flows into the Coral Sea near Port Alma.

Rhydding is a mixture of freehold and leasing land, used for grazing cattle.

History 
As the locality is within the parish of Rhydding, presumably it takes its name from the parish.

In the  Rhydding had a population of 63 people.

References 

Central Highlands Region
Localities in Queensland